The Suite Life Movie is a 2011 American science fiction comedy-drama television film directed by Sean McNamara, written by  Michael Saltzman, and starring Dylan and Cole Sprouse, Brenda Song, Debby Ryan, Matthew Timmons, John Ducey, Matthew Glave, and Phill Lewis. The Disney Channel Original Movie is based on the pair of Disney Channel sitcoms The Suite Life of Zack & Cody and The Suite Life on Deck created by Danny Kallis and Jim Geoghan. Dylan and Cole Sprouse were also executive producers for the movie. The film premiered on March 25, 2011 on the Disney Channel. A sneak peek was shown during the Disney Channel Shake It Up New Year's event.

Plot

After making plans to spend spring break with his girlfriend Bailey Pickett (Debby Ryan), Cody Martin (Cole Sprouse) decides to leave the SS Tipton, a large cruise ship where he attends school, to work as an intern for Dr. Donald Spaulding (John Ducey) at a prestigious research firm instead. He does so in hopes of obtaining a scholarship to Yale. When Cody's twin brother Zack (Dylan Sprouse) reveals Cody's plans to Bailey before Cody could, she becomes infuriated that Cody canceled his plans with her and refuses to speak to him. Meanwhile, Zack asks Cody for his car, which their parents will give to Cody when he goes to college, but Cody refuses.

However, after Zack runs a billion-dollar submarine into the seawall in an attempt to impress a cute science assistant, and Cody does the same trying to stop him, the equipment is lost and Cody is kicked out of the program and fired. Furious, Cody disowns Zack and vows to never forgive him, claiming they may be twins, but they definitely are not brothers. Elsewhere, London Tipton (Brenda Song) accidentally eats a fruit given to the dolphins which allows her to understand them.

The Martin twins later learn that although Cody will no longer be eligible to work as Dr. Spaulding's intern, both boys are ideal for the Gemini Project, a massive project by Dr. Ronald Olsen (Matthew Glave), who studies the physical and emotional connection of twins. Though it takes them much thought, the brothers agree and land themselves in a camp among hundreds of other twins. Dr. Olsen explains the purpose of the project is to create an emotional bond between people with the hopes of putting an end to evil in the world. By doing this, according to Dr. Olsen, he must form a bond between twins. Over the course of the project, which uses the same fruit as Dr. Spaulding's experiments, Zack and Cody form a bond: first a physical bond, in which they can sense what the other is feeling, then empathy, or an emotional bond. During this period, Zack and Cody realize why the other needs what he needs (Cody needs the scholarship in order to be with Bailey in Yale, and Zack needs the car to help him find his "calling" faster, due to the fact that he still does not know what to do in his life). After they hug it out, they overhear a conversation that reveals Dr. Olsen has evil intentions. Meanwhile, Bailey discovers Cody's letter and reads it. She realizes Cody only wanted to obtain a scholarship to Yale and goes with London and Woody (Matthew Timmons) to find him and Zack.

At the institute, London learns from a dolphin that Zack and Cody are at the Gemini Project and alerts Dr. Spaulding who claims that the Martin twins may be in danger, while Bailey calls the manager of the SS Tipton, Mr. Moseby (Phill Lewis), to the site of the Gemini Project while they all go to save Zack and Cody. During this time, the brothers attempt to flee the island and the army of twins, who are now mind-controlled to go after the two. The army succeeds, as Zack and Cody are captured and taken back to the laboratory, where Bailey, London, Woody, and Dr. Spaulding find them. Dr. Olsen reveals that he is Dr. Spaulding's evil twin and explains that he spied on Zack and Cody earlier.

After telling each other off, Zack and Cody begin to merge, but the merge is unsuccessful because the twins get into an argument that escalates into a fight, ultimately destroying the Gemini Project and freeing all the other twins from Ronald’s control. Ronald attempts to reboot the machine, but he is stopped by Cody who quickly forms a plan, and he and Zack give the special fruit to the Spaulding twins, who finally understand each other by telepathically discovering they wanted to be like each other all along. Mr. Moseby then comes in with the police who arrest Ronald. Zack and Cody now understand that they make a "pretty good team."

Afterward, Cody and Bailey have reconciled and visited landmarks together and Zack is driving his car, which Cody finally agreed to let him have. On the dock, Zack parks the car in a shipping area and sees his friends and brother on the SS Tipton. Unfortunately, the car is crushed by a shipping crate containing London's summer clothes. While Zack stares in shock, the movie ends with Mr. Moseby saying, "Well, spring break's over. Now if I could just make it to summer vacation."

Cast

 Cole Sprouse as Cody Martin
 Dylan Sprouse as Zack Martin
 Brenda Song as London Tipton
 Debby Ryan as Bailey Pickett
 Matthew Timmons as Woody Fink
 Phill Lewis as Mr. Moseby
 John Ducey as Dr. Donald Spaulding / Dr. Ronald Spaulding
 Matthew Glave as Dr. Ronald Olsen
 Katelyn Pacitto as Nellie Smith
 Kara Pacitto as Kellie Smith
 Steven French as Ben
 John French as Sven
 Norman Misura as Fish Monger
 Russ Rossi as Sea Captain

Broadcast
The film aired worldwide on Disney Channel. It premiered in the United Kingdom and Ireland on February 17, 2012. It premiered in Australia, New Zealand, Singapore, and the Philippines on June 25, 2011.

Home media
The film was made available on iTunes starting April 5, 2011 and on Netflix to stream on April 24, 2011. As of November 12, 2019, the film, along with both Suite Life series, have been available to stream on Disney+.

Reception

Sarah Peel of BSC Kids was positive about the film, saying the film was "typical" but said she was surprised at "just how funny it was". She later went on to say that it was a good film for younger children to watch. She gave the film a 7 out of 10.

The movie premiered with 5.2 million viewers. There were 780,000 viewers when it premiered in the UK and Ireland on February 17, 2012.

References

External links

 Official website
 

2011 comedy-drama films
2011 television films
2011 films
American science fiction comedy films
Disney Channel Original Movie films
2010s English-language films
Films about twin brothers
Films based on television series
Films directed by Sean McNamara
Films shot in Vancouver
The Suite Life series
American comedy-drama films
American teen comedy films
American teen drama films
American teen films
Television films based on television series
Twins in fiction
2010s American films